Podocan like 1 is a protein that in humans is encoded by the PODNL1 gene.

References

Further reading